Magic Still Exists is the fifth studio album by Swedish singer Agnes, released on 22 October 2021 through Universal Music Sweden.

Magic Still Exists received two nominations at the Swedish Grammis music awards.

Critical reception 
Michael Cragg of The Guardian called the album a "pop miracle" and a "soothing balm perfect for fleeting dancefloor moments".

Track listing

Charts

Release History

References 

2021 albums
Agnes (singer) albums
Universal Music Group albums